Communauté d'agglomération Terres de Montaigu is the communauté d'agglomération, an intercommunal structure, centred on the town of Montaigu-Vendée. It is located in the Vendée department, in the Pays de la Loire region, western France. Created in 2017, its seat is in Montaigu-Vendée. Its area is 379.3 km2. Its population was 49,428 in 2019, of which 20,424 in Montaigu-Vendée proper.

Composition
The communauté d'agglomération consists of the following 10 communes:

La Bernardière
La Boissière-de-Montaigu
La Bruffière
Cugand
L'Herbergement
Montaigu-Vendée
Montréverd
Rocheservière
Saint-Philbert-de-Bouaine
Treize-Septiers

References

Montaigu
Montaigu